Chi  (uppercase Χ, lowercase χ) is the 22nd letter of the Greek alphabet.

Greek

Pronunciation

Ancient Greek
Its value in Ancient Greek was an aspirated velar stop  (in the Western Greek alphabet: /ks/).

Koine Greek
In Koine Greek and later dialects it became a fricative (/) along with Θ and Φ.

Modern Greek
In Modern Greek, it has two distinct pronunciations: In front of high or front vowels ( or ) it is pronounced as a voiceless palatal fricative , as in German ich or like the h in some pronunciations of the English words hew and human. In front of low or back vowels (or ) and consonants, it is pronounced as a voiceless velar fricative, as in German ach or Spanish j.

Transliteration

Greek numeral
In the system of Greek numerals, it has a value of 600.

Xi
In ancient times, some local forms of the Greek alphabet used the chi instead of xi to represent the /ks/ sound. This was borrowed into the early Latin language, which led to the use of the letter X for the same sound in Latin, and many modern languages that use the Latin alphabet.

Cyrillic
Chi was also included in the Cyrillic script as the letter Х, with the phonetic value /x/ or /h/.

Chiasmus
Chi is the basis for the name literary chiastic structure and the name of chiasmus.

Symbolism
In Plato's Timaeus, it is explained that the two bands that form the soul of the world cross each other like the letter Χ. Plato's analogy, along with several other examples of chi  as a symbol occur in Thomas Browne's discourse The Garden of Cyrus (1658).

Chi or X is often used to abbreviate the name Christ, as in the holiday Christmas (Xmas). When fused within a single typespace with the Greek letter rho, it is called the labarum and used to represent the person of Jesus Christ.

Character encodings

Greek chi

Coptic khi

Latin chi

Mathematical chi

These characters are used only as mathematical symbols. Stylized Greek text should be encoded using the normal Greek letters, with markup and formatting to indicate text style.

Math and science
In statistics, the term chi-squared or  has various uses, including the chi-squared distribution, the chi-squared test, and chi-squared target models.

In algebraic topology, Chi is used to represent the Euler characteristic of a surface.

In neuroanatomy, crossings of peripheral nerves (such as the optic chiasm) are named for the letter Chi because of its Χ-shape.

In chemistry, the mole fraction and electronegativity may be denoted by the lowercase .

In physics,  denotes electric or magnetic susceptibility.

In rhetoric, both chiastic structure (a literary device) and the figure of speech Chiasmus derive from their names from the shape of the letter Chi.

In mechanical engineering, chi is used as a symbol for the reduction factor of relevant buckling loads in the EN 1993, a European Standard for the design of steel structures.

In graph theory, a lowercase chi is used to represent a graph's chromatic number.

In analytic number theory, chi is used for the Dirichlet character.

See also

Chi (disambiguation)
Х, х - Kha (Cyrillic)

References

Greek letters
Phonetic transcription symbols